Robert Robertson Craig (1 September 1881 – 5 March 1935) was an Australian rugby union and pioneer professional rugby league footballer who represented his country at both sports - a dual-code rugby international. He was a member of the Australian rugby union team, which won the gold medal at the 1908 Summer Olympics. Prior to his rugby career he won state championships in swimming and soccer and played top-level water polo.

All round sportsman
Prior to his rugby careers Craig was one of Australia's greatest all-round sportsmen. He won eight consecutive State swimming championships between 1899 and 1906; he appeared in four Sydney premiership winning water polo sides and in 1905 he was a member of the Balmain soccer club which that year won the Gardiner Cup, the NSW State competition.

Rugby union career
Craig toured Britain and North America with the 1908–09 Wallabies and at the end of that tour won Olympic Gold medal in London in the team captained by Chris McKivat. On his return to Australia he joined the fledgling code of rugby league along with 13 of his Olympic teammates.

Rugby league career
His club football was played with the Balmain Tigers whom he helped to win four premierships between 1915 and 1919.

Craig made his international league debut in the First Test in Sydney on 18 June 1910. Four of his former Wallaby teammates also debuted that day John Barnett, Jack Hickey, Charles Russell
and Chris McKivat – making them collectively Australia's 11th to 15th dual code internationals. This repeated a similar occurrence two years earlier when five former Wallabies in Micky Dore, Dally Messenger, Denis Lutge, Doug McLean snr and 
John Rosewell all debuted for the Kangaroos in the first ever Test against New Zealand, he also represented Australasia.

Craig played in both rugby league Tests against Great Britain in Australia in 1910 and was selected on the 1911–12 Kangaroo tour of Great Britain. He played 31 tour matches and scored 7 tries. He played at second row in all three victorious Tests of the tour. He is listed on the Australian Players Register as Kangaroo No.64.

He returned to representative honors in 1914 playing two Tests when Australia hosted the Great Britain tourists. All up Craig played in seven rugby league Tests and thirty-five times for Australia.

Post football
Craig was secretary of the Balmain Tigers between 1919–1922 and was also a delegate to the NSWRFL in 1923–1924. For a period he served as a state selector. He spent some years in Inverell, New South Wales as a publican at the Royal Hotel.

In the financial crises of the 1930s he suffered losses and saw a bleak future ahead. He committed suicide, hanging himself at a hospital in Leichhardt after being mentally ill for some time. Bob Craig was privately cremated at Rookwood. He was survived by his wife Eleanor, and three children.

See also
 Rugby union at the 1908 Summer Olympics

Footnotes

References
 Andrews, Malcolm (2006) The ABC of Rugby League, Austn Broadcasting Corpn, Sydney
 Collection (1995) Gordon Bray presents The Spirit of Rugby, Harper Collins Publishers Sydney
 Moran, Herbert (1939) Viewless Winds – the recollections and digressions of an Australian surgeon P Davies, London
 Whiticker, Alan (2004) Captaining the Kangaroos, New Holland, Sydney

External links

1885 births
1935 deaths
1935 suicides
Australasia rugby league team players
Australia international rugby union players
Australia national rugby league team players
Australian rugby league administrators
Australian rugby league players
Australian rugby union players
Balmain Tigers players
Dual-code rugby internationals
Olympic gold medalists for Australasia
Olympic rugby union players of Australasia
Rugby union players at the 1908 Summer Olympics
Medalists at the 1908 Summer Olympics
Rugby league players from Sydney
Rugby union players from Sydney
Rugby union hookers
Rugby union locks
Suicides by hanging in New South Wales